The 2014 European Shotgun Championships was the 60th edition of the global shotgun competition, European Shotgun Championships, organised by the European Shooting Confederation.

Results

Men

Women

Mixed
Note - exhibition event; no medals awarded

Medal table

See also
 Shotgun
 European Shooting Confederation
 International Shooting Sport Federation

References

External links
 

European Shooting Championships
European Shotgun Championships